Barnhill railway station (Angus) was a railway station in Scotland serving the suburb of Barnhill, Dundee.

History
The station was opened as Barnhill on 1 September 1874 by the Caledonian Railway on the Dundee and Forfar direct line which had been open since 12 August 1870.

The station had a single platform on a passing loop, there was a signal box and a small goods yard equipped with a 1½ ton crane.

A camping coach was positioned here by the Scottish Region from 1957 to 1964. The station was renamed Barnhill (Angus) on 30 June 1952 before closing to passengers on 10 January 1955. The line closed completely on 9 October 1967.

References

Bibliography

External links
 

Disused railway stations in Angus, Scotland
Former London, Midland and Scottish Railway stations
Railway stations in Great Britain opened in 1874
Railway stations in Great Britain closed in 1955